The Commando is a 2022 American action crime thriller film directed by Asif Akbar and starring Mickey Rourke and Michael Jai White.

It was released in the United States on January 7, 2022 by Saban Films.

Cast
Mickey Rourke as Johnny
Michael Jai White as James Baker
Jeff Fahey as Sheriff Alexander
Brendan Fehr as Sebastian 
Gianni Capaldi as Dominic
Donald Cerrone as Ray
Sam Tan as Sean 
Mia Terry as Jennifer
Nao Maes as Natalie 
Aris Mejía as Lisa
Matthew Van Wettering as Matthew 
Cord Newman as Rudy
John Enos III as Trey

Plot
A DEA SWAT team, lead by elite DEA agent James Baker (Michael Jai White), assault on a Mexican cartel's drug lab. The bad guys are taken out in the ensuing gun fight, but Baker inadvertently kills three hostages. As a result of PTSD-induced hallucinations and nightmares, caused by the killing of the innocent, Baker gets sent home to recover.

At this time, his family makes an unexpected discovery in their house - a stash of money worth $3 million. Baker just happens to live, with his wife Lisa (Aris Mejía) and  their two teenage daughters, in the house where career criminal Johnny (Mickey Rourke) stashed his loot. The Baker family soon faces the danger and threat of freshly sprung Johnny, who quickly reunites with his old crew to retake the $3 million of stolen money he hid before his arrest. Johnny is über-badass, just before his release, he "dealt" with three inmates who tried to skank him right before he was freed.

Eventually, James and Lisa head off for a quiet weekend together, leaving their two daughters home alone. The youngest girl promptly organizes a house party. It is during this party that Johnny's goons stage a home invasion.

Johnny and his henchmen will do whatever it takes to retrieve the money, including kidnap Baker's daughters. Stakes are high in this head-to-head battle as Baker stops at nothing to protect his family against the money-hungry criminals. There are many confrontations, but none of them between Baker and Johnny, until the final minutes.

One of the highlights is a high schooler getting shot while taking a leak and peeing all over his killer.

Production

Casting
In September 2020, it was announced that Rourke was cast in the film. In October 2020, White joined the cast of the film.

Filming
Principal photography occurred in New Mexico on October and November 2020.

Release
On December 7, 2021, Saban Films released a trailer for the film and set it for a January 7, 2022 release.

Reception
Rene Rodriguez of Variety gave the film a negative review and wrote, "A talky and lethargic home-invasion thriller, The Commando amounts to an inept crime drama stuffed with banal dialogue and irrelevant supporting characters to pad its feature-length running time."

Leslie Felperin of The Guardian awarded the film one star out of five and wrote, "The Commando contains a number of egregious implausibilities and cliches."

References

External links
 
 

2022 action thriller films
American action thriller films
American crime thriller films
Films shot in New Mexico
2022 crime thriller films
2022 crime action films
2020s English-language films
2020s American films